Moulton railway station may refer to:

 Moulton railway station (Lincolnshire), England
 Moulton railway station (North Yorkshire), England